Muhammad Asadullah Al-Ghalib (born 15 January 1948) is a Bangladeshi reformist Islamic scholar and former professor of Arabic at the University of Rajshahi. He is the leader of a puritan Islamic movement Ahl-i Hadith Andalon Bangladesh (AHAB). He is also the founder of an Islamic research journal, Monthly At-tahreek.
In an interview in 2017, Shakhawat Hossain, Ahl-e Hadith Andolon Bangladesh spokesperson, said the group claimed its lineage and the inspiration for its name from Islamist groups that had fought British colonialism in the early 19th century.

On 23 February 2005, the Bangladesh government arrested him following allegations of Islamic militancy. He was further alleged to have received funding from the Society of the Revival of Islamic Heritage.  However, he denied any involvement with Islamic militancy and was freed from jail on 28 August 2008. He was eventually acquitted of all charges.

Founded organisations
He founded various religious, educational and non-profit social welfare organizations in Bangladesh.
 Ahlehadeeth Andolon Bangladesh (Ahlehadeeth Movement Bangladesh) – A national Ahlehadeeth organisation, Founded on Friday, 23 September 1994.
 Bangladesh Ahlehadeeth Jubo Shangha – A youths' wing of Ahlehadeeth Movement Bangladesh, founded on 5 February 1978.
 Bangladesh Ahlehadeeth Mahilla Songstha - A ladies' wing of Ahlehadeeth Movement Bangladesh, Founded on 7 June 1981.
 Tawheed Trust (Regd) – A registered non-profit social welfare well-known organization, which is based in Rajshahi, Bangladesh, opened on 5 September 1989.
 Salafiyah Trust (Regd) - A registered social welfare organization, founded in 2002.
 Hadeeth Foundation Bangladesh – A renowned Islamic research foundation with Darul Ifta and publishing house, founded on 15 November 1992.
 Islamic Complex - Founded in 2010.
 Monthly at-Tahreek – An Islamic research journal first published in September 1997.
 Sonamoni - A children's wing of Ahlehadeeth Movement Bangladesh, founded in 1994.
 Pather Alo Foundation - A national project for orphans, sightless, disabled and neglected people, founded in 2009.

Works
Tarjamatul Quran
Tafsirul Quran

Views
In 2005, in conjunction with the protests led by the chief cleric, Ubaidul Haq, he led a protest in Rajshahi to condemn a series of bombings.

See also

 Shirk
 Bid‘ah
 Ibn Taymiyyah
 Ibn Qayyim al-Jawziyya
 Muhammad Nasiruddin al-Albani
 Syed Nazeer Husain Dehlawi
 Ehsan Elahi Zaheer
 Abd al-Aziz ibn Baz
 Muhammad ibn al Uthaymeen
 Zakir Naik
 Abdur Raheem Green

References

External links

1948 births
Living people
People from Satkhira District
Academic staff of the University of Rajshahi
Bangladeshi male writers
Bangladeshi Sunni Muslim scholars of Islam
Bangladeshi Salafis
Bangladeshi Islamic religious leaders
21st-century Muslim scholars of Islam
20th-century Muslim scholars of Islam
Apologists
Ahl-i Hadith people
Government Majid Memorial City College alumni
Bengali Muslim scholars of Islam